2018 in paleoentomology is a list of new fossil insect taxa that were described during the year 2018, as well as other significant discoveries and events related to paleoentomology that were scheduled to occur during the year.

Newly named taxa

Coleopterans

Dermapterans

Dictyopterans

Dipterans

Hemipterans

Hymenopterans

Mecopterans

Neuropterans

Odonatans

Orthopterans

Plecopterans

Trichopterans

Other insects

Research
 New insect fossils, including the earliest definite caddisfly cases, water boatmen, diverse polyphagan beetles and scorpionflies, are reported from the Triassic (Ladinian and Carnian) deposits of China by Zheng et al. (2018).
 Insect and plant inclusions are reported from amber from the uppermost Campanian Kabaw Formation of Tilin (Myanmar) by Zheng et al. (2018).
 Taphonomic study aiming to determine whether decay and preservation potential of insects in amber, and therefore bias in the amber fossil record, is affected by resin-type, dehydration prior to entombment, and the composition of the gut microbiota, is published by McCoy et al. (2018).
 A study on the evolution of insects as indicated by the morphological diversity of their mouthparts is published by Nel, Bertrand & Nel (2018).
 A study on the atmospheric oxygen levels through the Phanerozoic, evaluating whether Romer's gap and the concurrent gap in the fossil record of insects were caused by low oxygen levels, is published by Schachat et al. (2018).
 Reevaluation of the Jurassic ichnospecies Lunulipes obscurus is published by Getty & Loeb (2018), who interpret these trackways as most likely to be produced by a water boatman or an unknown insect that employed a similar method of swimming.
 An ellipsoidal chamber composed of a thin organic layer, interpreted as a likely insect cocoon or pupation chamber, is described from the Lower Cretaceous Jinju Formation (South Korea) by Lee (2018).
 A study on the body size of soil-dwelling insects across the Cretaceous-Paleogene boundary, inferred from burrows from the Big Bend National Park (Texas, United States) which were likely produced by beetle larvae or cicada nymphs, is published by Wiest et al. (2018).
 A study on the impact of sampling standardization, or lack thereof, on comparisons of insect herbivory from two Lower Permian localities in Texas is published by Schachat, Labandeira & Maccracken (2018).
 A study on the diversity, frequency and representation of insect damage of fossil plant specimens from the Permian La Golondrina Formation (Argentina) is published by Cariglino (2018).
 A study on the insect herbivory on fossil ginkgoalean and bennettitalean leaves from the Middle Jurassic Daohugou Beds (China), and on defenses of these plants against insect herbivory, is published by Na et al. (2018).
 A study on the plant–insect interactions in the European forest plant communities in the Upper Pliocene Lagerstätte of Willershausen (Lower Saxony, Germany), the Upper Pliocene locality of Berga (Thuringia, Germany) and the Pleistocene locality of Bernasso (France) is published by Adroit et al. (2018).
 Description and analysis of insect borings on hadrosaur bones from the late Campanian Cerro del Pueblo Formation (Mexico) is published by Serrano-Brañas, Espinosa-Chávez & Maccracken (2018), who name a new ichnospecies Cubiculum atsintli.
 Insect trace fossils collected from the Pliocene deposits at Laetoli (Tanzania) are described by Genise & Harrison (2018), who name new ichnotaxa Celliforma ritchiei, Laetolichnus kwekai and Teisseirei linguatus.
 Trace fossil produced by a wingless jumping insect belonging to the order Monura is described from the lower Permian of Southern Alps (Italy) by Bernardi, Marchetti & Gobbi (2018).
 A study on the venation in the forewing of the Triassic odonatopteran Zygophlebia tongchuanensis and extant dragonfly Aeshna isoceles is published by Jacquelin et al. (2018).
 Redescription of the meganeurid species Meganeurites gracilipes is published by Nel et al. (2018), who interpret this species as unlikely to have lived in densely forested environments, and more likely to be an open-space, ecotone or riparian forest predator, hunting in a way similar to extant hawkers.
 A study on the phylogenetic relationships of an Early Cretaceous plecopteran "Rasnitsyrina" culonga Sinitshenkova (2011) is published by Cui, Toussaint & Béthoux (2018).
 A female specimen of the plecopteran genus Podmosta, distinguished from other Podmosta females by the "rabbit-shaped" sclerite on sternum 8, is described from the Lithuanian Baltic amber by Chen (2018).
 A study on the structure of the wing base of the spilapterid palaeodictyopteran Dunbaria is published by Prokop et al. (2018).
 A study on the morphology of ovipositors of different fossil dictyopterans, on their possible reproductive strategies and on the evolution of the reproductive strategies within Dictyoptera is published by Hörnig et al. (2018).
 Cui, Evangelista & Béthoux (2018) reinterpret putative fossil mantis Prochaeradodis enigmaticus as more likely to be a cockroach belonging to the family Blaberidae.
 A revision of the hymenopteran fauna from the collection of the Cretaceous Burmese amber at the Nanjing Institute of Geology and Palaeontology (Chinese Academy of Sciences) is published by Zhang et al. (2018).
 An overview of the Eocene (Ypresian) hymenopteran assemblage of the Okanagan Highlands of British Columbia (Canada) and Washington (United States) is published by Archibald et al. (2018).
 A female of Dryinus janzeni is described from the Eocene Rovno amber (Ukraine) by Perkovsky & Olmi (2018), representing the first record of the dryinid genus Dryinus from Rovno amber.
 A study on the shape of the wing and the venational structures of the Eocene giant ants, including members of the genus Titanomyrma, evaluating the possibilities of determining species and sex of individual specimens with the use of geometric morphometrics, is published by Katzke et al. (2018).
 Fossil ant species Eocenomyrma rugosostriata is reported for the first time from the Eocene Rovno amber by Radchenko & Perkovsky (2018).
 A redescription of the Cretaceous nevrorthid species Cretarophalis patrickmuelleri is published by Lu et al. (2018).
 A redescription of the Cretaceous psychopsid species Grammapsychops lebedevi is published by Makarkin (2018).
 The first definite Mesozoic strepsipteran primary larva is reported from the Cretaceous amber from Myanmar by Pohl et al. (2018).
 A study on the phylogenetic relationships of the fossil rove beetles Cretodeinopsis and Electrogymnusa is published by Yamamoto & Maruyama (2018), who also describe new fossil material of Cretodeinopsis and Electrogymnusa.
 Remains of fossil nests of dung beetles, recorded in four formations of the Cenozoic of South America, are described by Cantil et al. (2018).
 A study on the phylogenetic placement of the fossil beetle "Spondylis" florissantensis is published by Vitali (2018), who transfers this species to the genus Neandra.
 The cosmopolitan beetle Necrobia violacea, formerly thought to be introduced to the New World through European trade, is reported from the La Brea Tar Pits by Holden, Barclay & Angus (2018).
 A study on the lepidopteran scales from the Triassic-Jurassic transition (Rhaetian-Hettangian) of Germany and their implications for inferring the timing of the radiation of lepidopteran lineages is published by van Eldijk et al. (2018).
 A study on the architecture of scales of Jurassic lepidopterans from the United Kingdom, Germany, Kazakhstan and China, and of tarachopterans from the Cretaceous amber from Myanmar, is published by Zhang et al. (2018).
 A study on the macroevolutionary responses of noctuid moths from the group Sesamiina and their associated host-grasses to environmental changes during the Neogene is published by Kergoat et al. (2018).
 A study on the anatomy of the digestive system of Saurophthirus longipes is published by Rasnitsyn & Strelnikova (2018).
 Mecopteran species "Orthophlebia" martynovae from the Lower Jurassic of Siberia (Russia) is transferred to the family Austropanorpidae and to the genus Austropanorpa by Krzemiński et al. (2018).
 Revision of the original type material and description of new fossils of the mecopteran species Chorista sobrina and Austropanorpa australis from the Paleogene Redbank Plains Formation (Australia) is published by Lambkin (2018).
 Redescription of known members of the peloropeodine genus Palaeomedeterus from Baltic amber is published by Grichanov & Negrobov (2018), who provide a key to species of Palaeomedeterus from Baltic amber.
 A study on changes in insect biodiversity in terms of the number of families throughout the history of the group is published by Dmitriev et al. (2018).

References

2018 in paleontology
Paleoentomology
2018 in science